Cugnaux (Languedocien: Cunhaus) is a commune in the Haute-Garonne department in southwestern France.

Population

The inhabitants of the commune are known as Cugnalais.

Twin towns
Cugnaux is twinned with these
 Cavarzere, Italy (Since 2002)
 Camargo, Spain
 Riverdale, United States

See also
Communes of the Haute-Garonne department

References

Communes of Haute-Garonne